The San Francisco 49ers Gold Rush Cheerleaders are the cheerleading team for the NFL's San Francisco 49ers. The current team was founded in 1983 by USA, which has been renamed to e2k. They have performed throughout the United States, Europe, and Japan. They are also involved in many charitable events.

They have been featured on many television stations, such as ESPN and the Fox Network, in addition to television shows such as Entertainment Tonight, MTV, Extra!, and The Leeza Show. They attend every home game and have a total of 32 professional dancers. At Kezar Stadium, the cheerleaders were called The Niner Nuggets. They were known at the time as the only singing cheerleading squad in the NFL.

On November 1, 2018, an unnamed 49ers Gold Rush Cheerleader became the first NFL cheerleader to kneel in silent protest, a protest started in 2016 by the former 49ers’ quarterback Colin Kaepernick.

Notable members
Julie Durda, meteorologist, contestant on the fifth season of The Bachelor
Teri Hatcher, (1984), actress
Angela King-Twitero, executive and CEO of The House of AKD
Bonnie-Jill Laflin, (1994–1996), model, actress, television personality
Morgan McLeod, (2009), contestant from Survivor: Cagayan

See also

References

External links
 

National Football League cheerleading squads
San Francisco 49ers
1979 establishments in California
Performing groups established in 1979
History of women in California